Windol C. Weaver is an American politician from Maine. In 2006, Weaver, a Republican, was elected to the Maine House of Representatives from District 150, which included his residence in York, Maine. He was subsequently re-elected in 2008, 2010 and 2012. In 2010, Weaver was appointed chair of the Maine Joint Committee
Marine Resources. He was unable to seek re-election in 2014 due to term-limits.

Personal
Weaver graduated from Waco High School in 1959. He attended Texas A&M University and served four tours in Vietnam from 1967 to 1970 and retired from his military career in 1987 as a lieutenant colonel. He and his family moved to York, Maine in 1980 and subsequently became involved in town and county government.

References

External links
Campaign Website

Year of birth missing (living people)
Living people
United States Air Force personnel of the Vietnam War
Republican Party members of the Maine House of Representatives
People from York, Maine
Texas A&M University alumni
United States Air Force officers
Waco High School alumni